The 2018–19 Central Arkansas Bears basketball team represent the University of Central Arkansas during the 2018–19 NCAA Division I men's basketball season. The Bears are led by fifth-year head coach Russ Pennell and play their home games at the Farris Center in Conway, Arkansas as members of the Southland Conference.

Previous season
The Bears finished the 2017–18 season 18–17, 10–8 in Southland play to finish in seventh place. They defeated Lamar in the first round of the Southland tournament before losing in the quarterfinals to Stephen F. Austin. They were invited to the College Basketball Invitational where they defeated Seattle before losing in the quarterfinals to Jacksonville State.

Roster

Schedule and results
Sources:

|-
!colspan=9 style=| Exhibition

|-
!colspan=9 style=| Non-Conference regular season

|-
!colspan=9 style=|Southland regular season

|-
!colspan=9 style=| Southland tournament

See also
2018–19 Central Arkansas Sugar Bears basketball team

References

Central Arkansas Bears basketball seasons
Central Arkansas
Central Arkansas Bears basketball
Central Arkansas Bears basketball